KMOU (104.7 FM) is a radio station broadcasting a Country music format. Licensed to Roswell, New Mexico, United States, the station is currently owned by Majestic Broadcasting, LLC.

References

External links
 104.7 KMOU Facebook
 

Country radio stations in the United States
MOU